Jacques de Vink (born 15 June 1942) is a Dutch volleyball player. He competed in the men's tournament at the 1964 Summer Olympics.

References

1942 births
Living people
Dutch men's volleyball players
Olympic volleyball players of the Netherlands
Volleyball players at the 1964 Summer Olympics
Sportspeople from Leiden